The Stolen Bride is a surviving 1927 American silent drama film directed by Alexander Korda and starring Billie Dove, Lloyd Hughes, and Armand Kaliz. The film is a Hungarian-set romance across classes, where an aristocrat and a peasant fall in love.

Production
The production was Korda's first Hollywood film after moving to America from Berlin where he had previously been working. Korda was assigned the film in large part because he was a native of Hungary, where the film's action is set. It was shot at the Burbank Studios of First National Pictures during the summer of 1927. It was a moderate success once it was released in August 1927. It was released in Britain on May 28, 1928. Korda's next film was the far more successful The Private Life of Helen of Troy.

Cast
 Billie Dove - Sari, Countess Thurzo 
 Lloyd Hughes - Franz Pless 
 Armand Kaliz - Baron von Heimburg 
 Frank Beal - Count Thurzo 
 Lilyan Tashman - Ilona Taznadi 
 Cleve Moore - Lt. Kiss 
 Otto Hoffman - Papa Pless 
 Charles Wellesley - The Regiment Pater 
 Bert Sprotte - Sergeant
 Paul Vincenti

References

Bibliography
 Kulik, Karol. Alexander Korda: The Man Who Could Work Miracles. Virgin Books, 1990.

External links

allmovie/synopsis

1927 films
1927 romantic drama films
American romantic drama films
American silent feature films
Films directed by Alexander Korda
Films set in Hungary
Films set in Austria
American World War I films
First National Pictures films
Lost American films
American black-and-white films
1920s American films
Silent romantic drama films
Silent American drama films